Alphonso Son "Dizzy" Reece (born 5 January 1931) is a Jamaican-born hard bop jazz trumpeter. Reece is among a group of jazz musicians born in Jamaica which includes Bertie King, Joe Harriott, Roland Alphonso, Wilton Gaynair, Sonny Bradshaw, saxophonists Winston Whyte and Tommy McCook, trombonist Don Drummond, pianists Wynton Kelly, Monty Alexander, bassist Coleridge Goode, guitarist Ernest Ranglin and percussionists Count Ossie and Lloyd Knibb.

Biography
Reece was born on 5 January 1931 in Kingston, Jamaica, the son of a silent film pianist. He attended the Alpha Boys School (known for its musical alumni), switching from baritone saxophone to trumpet when he was 14 years old. A full-time musician from the age of 16, he moved to London in 1948 and spent the 1950s working in Europe, much of that time in Paris. He played with Don Byas, Kenny Clarke, Frank Foster and Thad Jones, among others. Recording with British musicians, he led several sessions in London in 1955–1957. Also in London, he recorded what became his first Blue Note album, Blues in Trinity (1958). Donald Byrd and Art Taylor were his sidemen. Gaining praise from Miles Davis and Sonny Rollins, the trumpeter settled in New York City in 1959 and recorded with several of Davis' bandmates, but found New York in the 1960s a struggle.

Reece recorded other records for the Blue Note label, which were reissued by Mosaic in 2004. Still active as a musician and writer, Reece has recorded over the years with Hank Mobley, Wynton Kelly, Paul Chambers, Ronnie Scott, Phil Seaman, Victor Feldman, Tubby Hayes, Paris Reunion Band, Clifford Jordan’s Big Band, tenor saxophonist Dexter Gordon, fellow trumpeter Ted Curson, pianist Duke Jordan, long-time Sun Ra alumni saxophonist John Gilmore, and drummers Philly Joe Jones and Art Taylor.

Reece wrote the music for the 1958 Ealing Studios film, Nowhere to Go.

Discography

As leader
Blue Note
1958:  Blues in Trinity
1959:  Star Bright
1960:  Comin' On!
1960:  Soundin' Off
Others
 A New Star (Jasmine, 1955–56) with Phil Seamen
 Progress Report (Jasmine, 1956–58) with Victor Feldman, Tubby Hayes
 Asia Minor (New Jazz, 1962)
 Nirvana: The Zen of the Jazz Trumpet (Jazz Vision, 2006) recorded 1968
 From In to Out - (Futura, 1970)
 Possession, Exorcism, Peace (Honey Dew, 1974)
 Manhattan Project (Bee Hive, 1978)
 Blowin' Away (Interplay, 1978) with Ted Curson

Compilations
 Mosaic Select: Dizzy Reece (MS-011) - compiles Blues in Trinity (1958), Star Bright (1959), Soundin' Off (1960), and Comin' On! (1960).

As sideman
With Victor Feldman
Suite Sixteen (Contemporary, 1955 [1958])
With Dizzy Gillespie
The Dizzy Gillespie Reunion Big Band (MPS, 1968)
With Dexter Gordon
A Day in Copenhagen (MPS, 1969)
With Andrew Hill
Passing Ships (Blue Note, 1969)
With Philly Joe Jones 
Round Midnight (Lotus, 1969 [1980])
With Clifford Jordan
Inward Fire (Muse, 1978)
Play What You Feel (Mapleshade, 1990 [1997])
Down Through the Years (Milestone, 1991)
With Duke Jordan
Flight to Jordan (Blue Note, 1960)
With Hank Mobley
The Flip (Blue Note, 1969)

References

External links 
 Dizzy Reece website with interviews, music
 Discography and articles
 All About Jazz Interview

1931 births
Living people
Musicians from Kingston, Jamaica
Hard bop trumpeters
Jamaican jazz trumpeters
Blue Note Records artists
21st-century trumpeters